Ernophthora schematica is a species of snout moth in the genus Ernophthora. It was described by Alfred Jefferis Turner in 1947 and is found in Australia.

References
.
. As cited by the Australian Faunal Directory.

Moths described in 1947
Cabniini